Saint Edward King and Confessor Church is a Roman Catholic church in Clifford, West Yorkshire. The church is the largest in Clifford and its tall tower is the most prominent structure in the area. The church is a grade II Listed building and serves Clifford and the surrounding villages. The church lies in the Roman Catholic diocese of Leeds and deanery of Harrogate.

History
The church was built to serve the population of Irish workers that came to work in the flax mill owned by the Grimston Brothers that was established in the village in 1831. The Grimstons, Cliffords and Vavasour families contributed to the cost of building the church. It was built in the Romanesque style by J.A. Hansom to designs by Ramsay between 1845 and 1848. The tower was built to designs by George Goldie and completed in 1866-7. It was built on the site of a former Wesleyan Chapel, hence its location on Chapel Lane, where it joins the High Street.

Interior
There is a three-bay arcade under the west organ gallery in the tower. The aisle arcades have plain cylindrical piers and octagonal capitals to round arches. The three eastern bays form the sanctuary.

Exterior

The church is built in ashlar Magnesian Limestone and has a green slate roof in the Romanesque style. There is a seven bay aisled nave and chancel with small east Lady Chapel and a five-stage west tower with buttresses to the fourth stage. At the southwest corner of the tower there is a square stair-turret which becomes cylindrical after the second stage and has a conical roof above the fifth stage. The base of the tower is open to the first stage and has round arches on three sides. The tower has a pyramidal ashlar roof with a finial. The vestry is on the north side and on the south side there is a chapel.

The churchyard contains a war grave of an Army Air Corps soldier of World War II.

Gallery

See also
 Leeds Cathedral
 Listed buildings in Clifford, West Yorkshire

References

Bibliography

External links

 Diocese of Leeds - Come and see St Edward's Catholic Church, Clifford

Listed buildings in Leeds
Roman Catholic churches in West Yorkshire
Grade II listed churches in West Yorkshire
Italianate architecture in England
Roman Catholic Diocese of Leeds
Grade II listed Roman Catholic churches in England
George Goldie church buildings
Italianate church buildings in the United Kingdom